Island Row is the second album by IDM producer Capitol K. The record was released by Planet Mu in 2000, and re-released by XL Recordings in 2002.

"Pillow" peaked at No. 99 on the UK Singles Chart.

Critical reception
Exclaim! wrote that "the music sounds so full and complex that you could lose your mind trying to figure out what all of the different noises are." The Independent called the album "the missing link between Badly Drawn Boy and Squarepusher, with the former's wistful introversion shredded into digital bricolage by the latter's cut-up techniques." The Sunday Times wrote that Capitol K "has astonishing sampling/sequencing/ programming skills, but he transforms his hours spent hunched over an Atari into music bursting with life."

Track listing
"City" – 5:21
"Pillow" – 3:12
"Anon" – 6:07
"Soundwaves" – 5:26
"Capitol Beat Sticky" - 4:51
"Darussalam" – 4:31
"God Ohm" – 3:33
"Breakers" – 6:14
"Heat" – 5:45
"Monster" – 4:53
"Duffle Coat" – 4:01

References

2000 albums
Planet Mu albums
XL Recordings albums